Vardashen may refer to:
Vardashen, Ararat, Armenia
Vardashen, Yerevan, Armenia
Oğuz, Azerbaijan (formerly known as Vartashen or Vardashen)